Perry County may refer to:

United States
Perry County, Alabama 
Perry County, Arkansas 
Perry County, Illinois 
Perry County, Indiana 
Perry County, Kentucky
Perry County, Mississippi 
Perry County, Missouri 
Perry County, Ohio 
Perry County, Pennsylvania 
Perry County, Tennessee

Australia
Perry County, New South Wales

See also 
Perry (disambiguation)

County name disambiguation pages